The Comeback Kid is a 1980 American made-for-television romantic comedy sports film starring John Ritter, Susan Dey and Doug McKeon which was broadcast on ABC on April 11, 1980. The film features many actors well known from their TV appearances: Ritter (Three's Company), Dey (The Partridge Family), Gregory (Barney Miller), Licht (Valerie/The Hogan Family), Lembeck (One Day at a Time), McKeon (On Golden Pond), and Kim Fields (The Facts of Life). It also stars Patrick Swayze in an early minor role.

Plot
Bubba Newman, a minor league baseball player, decides to quit the sport and do something else with his life because he feels "down and out." He renews his outlook on life when he becomes a coach for a group of underprivileged kids and finds romance. Then, one of the youngsters gets hit by a car while racing to meet Bubba when he returns to the team. The kid's death ultimately brings the group and their coach even closer.

Cast
 John Ritter as Bubba Newman
 Susan Dey as Megan Barrett
 Doug McKeon as Michael
 James Gregory as Scotty
 Jeremy Licht as Paul
 Dick O'Neill as Phil
 Rod Gist as Ray Carver
 Michael Lembeck as Tony
 Patrick Swayze as Chuck
 Angela Aames as Sherry
 Tan Adams as Shirley
  as Frank
 Kevin King Cooper as Tank
 Kim Fields as Molly
 Hank Robinson as the Umpire

External links
 

American television films
1980 television films
1980 films
1980 romantic comedy films
Films scored by Barry De Vorzon
Films directed by Peter Levin
American romantic comedy films